Calvary Presbyterian Church is a historic Presbyterian church complex at 909 Castleton Avenue in West New Brighton, Staten Island, New York. www.calvarypresby.org  The complex consists of the Romanesque/Tudor Revival-style church building (built 1894, addition 1952), parish house (1930), manse (1919), and a one car garage.

Boy Scouts of America have been part of Calvary's Mission since 1984. Today they have a Cub Pack, a Troop and a Venture Crew. Calvary's Scouting Units 19 were founded in West Brighton, Staten Island in 1916 and moved to Calvary in 1984 

Calvary was added to the National Register of Historic Places in 2002.

References

Presbyterian churches in New York City
Properties of religious function on the National Register of Historic Places in Staten Island
Churches completed in 1894
19th-century Presbyterian church buildings in the United States
Churches in Staten Island
1894 establishments in New York (state)
West New Brighton, Staten Island